Adrian Pisarello (born 23 August 1970 from Gibraltar) is a Gibraltarian rock, punk and folk musician and songwriter.

Biography
Adrian started his musical career playing in various local bands as Lead Vocalist, Rhythm Guitarist and Lyricist/Songwriter, he played everything from Blues, Funk and Reggae to Punk and Heavy Metal. During this period Adrian recorded some demos and videos and played in several bars and clubs locally. The highlight came with performances and the first Gibraltar National Day Concert and supporting Shaggy in June 1996.

Seeing that forming part of a band would not take his song writing the direction he wanted, he decided to start working as a solo artist. He immediately started working on his song writing and records a few songs. Among these he entered the song "Libertad" in the John Lennon Songwriting Contest. To his delight he won first prize in the Latin category being the only European Grand Prize winner in twelve different categories. The prize includes a publishing contract with EMI for the winning song.

Shortly after, 1999, Adrian finished his first album Cuidado Con El a six track EP. This has a good response with the critics and general public, several public appearances in the local media follow.
In 2000 Adrian jumped into the international stage supporting two Spanish Chart toppers, Gibraltarian band Melon Diesel and the Argentinian King Africa.

In 2001 he joins local band Reach as session rhythm guitarist and tours Spain supporting the biggest Spanish band at that moment, Estopa. Reach played in ten different Spanish cities to sell out crowds. The highlight of the year came as Adrian released his second studio album Adelante, this more mature album allows Adrian to further express himself as an artist and cements him as a main contributor to the music scene in Gibraltar.

During the last few years Adrian has been a regular in the local music scene continuing to play in many venues with Eric Rowbottom. He has supported the successful London based band Breed 77 on their two concerts on the rock. In 2006 he launched a new studio album titled No Hay Dos Sin Tres. In 2007/2008 Adrian formed punk band The Return Of The Punk Zombies. On 9 September 2008 The Return Of The Punk Zombies were announced the winners of the Rock on the Rock Club Battle of the Bands competition.

Discography

Albums
 Adelante (2001)
 No Hay Dos Sin Tres (2006)

EPs
 Cuidado Con El (1999)

References

External links
 Official Web Site

British male guitarists
British songwriters
1970 births
Living people
Gibraltarian guitarists
Gibraltarian songwriters
21st-century British guitarists
21st-century British male musicians
British male songwriters